Tetrahedron Letters is a weekly international journal for rapid publication of full original research papers in the field of organic chemistry. According to the Journal Citation Reports, the journal has a 2020 impact factor of 2.415.

Indexing
Tetrahedron Letters is indexed in:

References

See also
Tetrahedron
Tetrahedron: Asymmetry

Chemistry journals
Weekly journals
Publications established in 1959
Elsevier academic journals